Doug Post is an American politician. He is a Republican who represented the 7th district in the South Dakota House of Representatives from 2019 to 2021.

Political career 

In 2016, Post ran to represent District 7 in the South Dakota State Senate, but lost the Republican primary to Larry Tidemann.

In 2018, Post ran for one of District 7's two seats in the South Dakota House of Representatives. He and fellow Republican Tim Reed won in a five-way race with two Democrats and one independent candidate.

In 2020, Post ran for re-election, but lost in the Republican primary.

Electoral record

References 

Living people
Republican Party members of the South Dakota House of Representatives
Year of birth missing (living people)
21st-century American politicians